Dead is a live album by American death metal band Obituary. The title is a comical reference to it being a "live" album.

Track listing

Personnel
John Tardy - vocals
Allen West - lead guitar
Trevor Peres - rhythm guitar
Frank Watkins - bass
Donald Tardy - drums

References

Obituary (band) albums
1998 live albums
Roadrunner Records live albums